= Gargaú River =

River in Brazil

Location
- Country: Brazil

Physical characteristics
- Source
  - location: Paraíba state

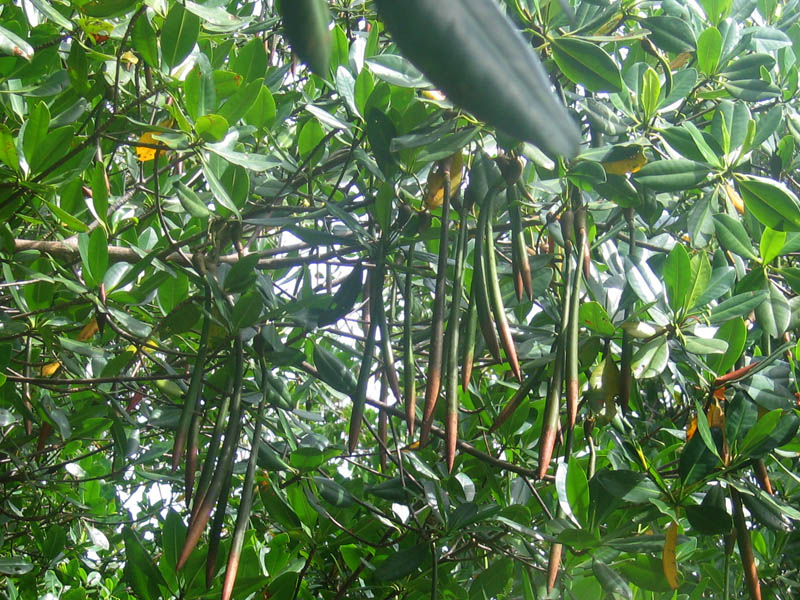
Mangrove, ecosystem that occupies a large part of the Gargaú streambed.

The Gargaú River is a Brazilian river that bathes the coast of the state of Paraíba. Located in the region of Várzea Paraibana, important events in the history of Paraíba took place on its banks, especially during the sugar cane cycle in Brazil, the time of Colonial Brazil.
